Kolehu (also Romanized as Kolehū, Koleh Hū, and Kalhū; also known as Kolehū-ye Soflá and Koleh Hū-ye Soflá) is a village in Kashkan Rural District, Shahivand District, Dowreh County, Lorestan Province, Iran. At the 2006 census, its population was 979, in 201 families.

References 

Towns and villages in Dowreh County